The men's four-cross is an event at the annual UCI Mountain Bike & Trials World Championships. It has been held since the 2002 championships, having replaced the dual event. In 2014 and 2015 the four-cross events were held separately from the UCI Mountain Bike & Trials World Championships as the UCI Four-cross World Championships.

Medal table

References
Results from the Union Cycliste Internationale's website.

Events at the UCI Mountain Bike & Trials World Championships